The following is a list of amusement parks in Africa sorted by region.

Algeria

Algiers
 Expo Center Park
 Parc d'Attractions d'Alger

Botswana
 Lion Park

Egypt
 Cairo Land
 Dream Park
 Fantazy Land, Alexandria
 Geroland
 Kooky Park, closed for renovation, Giza
 Magic Land, closed for renovation
 Sindbad City
 Family Park

Libya
 Il Bosco, Benghazi

Mauritius
 Casela World of Adventures

Morocco

Casablanca
 Crazy Park, Casablanca
 Loupi Park Land
 Magic Forest
 Parc Sindibad, Casablanca

Other

 Magic Park, Salé
 xTreme Park, Agadir

Nigeria
 Delta Leisure Resort, Warri Delta
Luxurious Toho Island, Abuja, FCT
African Heritage City, Abuja, U/C
 Dreamworld Africana, Lagos
 Fun Factory, Lagos
 Hi-Impact Planet, Lagos
 Trans Amusement Park, Ibadan, Oyo
 Wonderland Themepark, Abuja FCT

South Africa

Gauteng
 Emperors Palace, Johannesburg
 Gold Reef City, Johannesburg
 Monte Casino Entertainment Complex, Johannesburg

KwaZulu-Natal
 Mini town - Durban, KwaZulu-Natal
 uShaka Marine World - Durban, KwaZulu-Natal
 Durban Funworld - Durban, KwaZulu-Natal
 WaveHouse - UMhlanga, KwaZulu-Natal

Eastern Cape
 Wild Waves - Wild Coast Region, Eastern Cape

North West
 Valley of Waves - Sun City, North West

Western Cape
 Adventure Land - Plettenberg Bay, Western Cape

Sudan
 Al Mogran Amusement Park, Khartoum

See also
List of amusement parks
List of water parks in Africa

References

Africa
Amusement parks
Amusement parks